Accident Fund Insurance Company of America is an American workers' compensation insurance company headquartered in Lansing, Michigan.  The company is a member of AF Group, a provider of insurance. Insurance policies may be issued by any of the following companies within AF Group: Accident Fund Insurance Company of America, Accident Fund National Insurance Company, Accident Fund General Insurance Company, United Wisconsin Insurance Company, Third Coast Insurance Company or CompWest Insurance Company.

The company is led by Stephen Cooper, president.

History
Accident Fund was founded as a state operation in 1912. It was purchased by Blue Cross Blue Shield of Michigan in 1994.

In April 2011, Accident Fund completed redevelopment of the Ottawa Street Power Station, an Art Deco landmark on the Grand River in downtown Lansing, Michigan, as its new corporate headquarters.

References

External links
 

Companies based in Lansing, Michigan
Insurance companies of the United States
American companies established in 1912
Financial services companies established in 1912
1912 establishments in Michigan
Workers' compensation
1994 mergers and acquisitions